The 2002 Arizona Wildcats baseball team represented the University of Arizona during the 2002 NCAA Division I baseball season. The Wildcats played their home games at Frank Sancet Stadium. The team was coached by Andy Lopez in his 1st season at Arizona. Former head coach Jerry Stitt - who had been spent the previous 23 seasons on the coaching staff (the last 5 as head coach) - resigned prior to the season. The Wildcats finished with a record of 31-24 and placed 8th in the Pacific-10 Conference with 9-15 record.

Previous season 
The Wildcats finished the 2001 season with an overall record of 33-23. They finished 5th in conference play with a record of 12-12. Arizona missed the postseason for a 2nd straight year and 4th time in Jerry Stitt's 5 seasons as head coach.

Personnel

Roster

Coaches

Opening day

Schedule and results

2002 MLB Draft

References 

Arizona
Arizona Wildcats baseball seasons
Arizona baseball